James Patrick Keogh (1888 – 31 August 1940) was a member of the Queensland Legislative Assembly.

Biography
Keogh was born in Thurles, Tipperary, the son of William Keogh and his wife Mary (née Maher). He arrived in Queensland around 1902 and worked as a miner in north Queensland before serving in the 1st AIF assigned as a gunner to the 3rd Battery Australian Field Artillery Regiment in World War I. Here he was one of the original Anzacs who fought at Gallipoli. Later in the war he was gassed, wounded and reported dead while serving in Belgium and finally invalided back to Australia. In the 1930s he was once again reported dead from the pulpit of his local church but when friends went to his home to offer their condolences they found him mowing his lawn.

On 20 December 1918 he married Clara Ethel Clifford (died 1978) in England and together had three sons and three daughters. Keogh had been ill for some time before dying at the Rosemount Military Hospital in August 1940. It is thought that the effects of the gassing and injuries he received in World War I hastened his death. He was buried in the Nudgee Cemetery.

Public career
Keogh was an alderman on the Brisbane City Council, representing the ward of Fortitude Valley from 1925 until 1931. During that time he served on nearly all of the council's committees.

From 1932 until his death in 1940 Keogh was the member for Merthyr in the Queensland Legislative Assembly. He was the government representative on the Metropolitan Fire Brigade Board.

References

Members of the Queensland Legislative Assembly
1888 births
1940 deaths
Burials at Nudgee Cemetery
Australian Labor Party members of the Parliament of Queensland
20th-century Australian politicians
Australian military personnel of World War I
Australian Army soldiers